Sthenias maculiceps is a species of beetle in the family Cerambycidae. It was described by Charles Joseph Gahan in 1890. It is known from Sri Lanka and India.

References

maculiceps
Beetles described in 1890